International Anti-Corruption Day has been observed annually, on 9 December, since the passage of the United Nations Convention Against Corruption on 31 October 2003 to raise public awareness for anti-corruption.

Background
The Convention states, in part, that the UN is: 
concerned about the seriousness of problems and threats posed by corruption to the stability and security of societies, undermining the institutions and values of democracy, ethical values and justice and jeopardizing sustainable development and the rule of law 

and delegates to the convention the power to: 
promote and strengthen measures to prevent and combat corruption more efficiently and effectively... promote, facilitate and support international cooperation and technical assistance in the prevention of and fight against corruption… [and] promote integrity, accountability and proper management of public affairs and public property…

Your NO counts campaign 
The "Your NO Counts" campaign is a joint international campaign created by the United Nations Development Programme and the United Nations Office on Drugs and Crime to mark International Anti-Corruption Day (9 December) and raise awareness about corruption and how to fight it.

The 2009 joint international campaign focused on how corruption hinders efforts to achieve the internationally agreed upon Millennium Development Goals undermines democracy and the rule of law, leads to human rights violations, distorts markets, erodes quality of life and allows organized crime, terrorism and other threats to human security to flourish.

See also 
 Global Witness
 Group of States Against Corruption
 International Anti-Corruption Academy
 ISO 37001 Anti-bribery management systems
 United Nations Convention against Corruption
 OECD Anti-Bribery Convention
 Transparency International

References

External links
 International Anti-Corruption Day official website
 Anti-Corruption Day on United Nations web

Corruption
United Nations days
December observances
Anti-corruption activism